Chinese Squash Association is the National Organisation for Squash in China.

External links
Official site

Squash
National members of the World Squash Federation
Squash in China